Blue Murder by Peter Nichols was written in 1995 as a four-act drama, in response to those who had often questioned why Nichols had never written a play surrounding a murder investigation. Blue Murder opened at Royal Court Theatre in London on 23 May 1995 without the performance of the third act. Despite Nichols' objections, the third act was removed due to budgetary constraints. The play was not performed in its entirety until 1998 by the Show of Strength Theatre Company at the Lyceum Theatre, Edinburgh.

Plays by Peter Nichols
1995 plays